Linn County Courthouse may refer to:

 Linn County Courthouse (Iowa), Cedar Rapids, Iowa
 Linn County Courthouse (Kansas), Mound City, Kansas
 Linn County Courthouse (Missouri), Linneus, Missouri
 Linn County Courthouse (Oregon), Albany, Oregon